Art Ingels (sometimes misspelled as Ingles; May 14, 1918 - December 16, 1981) is known as 'the father of karting'.

In 1956, while he was a race car builder at Kurtis Kraft, a famous builder of Indy race cars during the 1950s, he assembled the first Go-Kart in history out of scrap metal and a surplus West Bend Company two-stroke engine.  It was built in his two-car garage in Echo Park, California, (now FIX Coffee Co), and was tested in the Rose Bowl parking lot, where it gained hundreds of enthusiasts.

See also 
 List of people known as "father" or "mother" of something

References

External links
The first kart at Vintage Karts
Commentary on Art Ingels Kart at Rear Engine Karts Website

American racing drivers
People from Echo Park, Los Angeles
Place of birth missing
1918 births
1981 deaths
Racing drivers from California
Racing drivers from Los Angeles
Sportspeople from Los Angeles